Funke, Funke Wisdom is the fourth solo studio album by American recording artist Kool Moe Dee from the Treacherous Three. It was released in 1991 via Jive Records, making it the rapper's final album on the label.

Background
Production of the record was handled by Teddy Riley, Dale Hogan, Keith Spencer and Kool Moe Dee. The album peaked at #72 on the Billboard 200 and #19 on Top R&B/Hip-Hop Albums. It spawned three singles: "How Kool Can One Black Man Be", "Death Blow" and "Rise 'N' Shine".

"Rise 'N' Shine" featuring KRS-One & Chuck D became the most successful single, reaching number one on the Hot Rap Songs chart. "How Kool Can One Black Man Be" peaked at #9 on Hot Rap Songs and #49 on Hot R&B/Hip-Hop Songs. The track "Death Blow", a diss track directed at LL Cool J, did not chart, and the music video satirized LL Cool J's "Mama Said Knock You Out" video.

Track listing

Sample credits
Track 2 contains elements from "Make It Funky" and "Hot Pants" by James Brown (1971)
Track 3 contains elements from "Escape-ism" by James Brown (1971), "Bring the Noise" by Public Enemy (1987) and "Atomic Dog" by George Clinton (1982)
Track 4 contains elements from "Mind Power" by James Brown (1973)
Track 5 contains elements from "Papa Don't Take No Mess" by James Brown (1974)
Track 6 contains elements from "Funky Drummer" by James Brown (1970)
Track 7 contains elements from "Outa-Space" by Billy Preston (1971) and "Stand!" by Sly & the Family Stone (1969)
Track 9 contains elements from "Bigger's Theme" by Mtume (1986)
Track 10 contains elements from "Get on the Good Foot" by James Brown (1972), "Escape-ism" by James Brown (1971), "Rock the Bells" by LL Cool J (1985), "Let's Go" by Kool Moe Dee (1987), "To Da Break of Dawn" and "Mama Said Knock You Out" by LL Cool J (1990), "Change the Beat (Female Version)" by Beside (1982) and "It Gets No Rougher" by LL Cool J (1989)
Track 11 contains elements from "Soul Power" by James Brown (1971), "Blow Your Head" by Fred Wesley & The J.B.'s (1974) and "Poison" by Bell Biv DeVoe (1990)
Track 12 contains elements from "Spirit of the Boogie" by Kool & the Gang (1975) and "Introduction to the J.B.'s" by Fred Wesley & The J.B.'s (1973)
Track 13 contains elements from "Gangster Boogie" by Chicago Gangsters (1975) and "Get on the Good Foot" by James Brown (1972)
Track 14 contains elements from "Funky Worm" by Ohio Players (1972), "I Know You Got Soul" by Eric B. & Rakim (1987), "Think (About It)" by Lyn Collins (1972) and "It Takes Two" by Rob Base & DJ E-Z Rock (1988)

Personnel

Mohandes Dewese – vocals, producer
Carlton Douglas Ridenhour – vocals (track 7)
Lawrence Parker – vocals (track 7)
Steve Arrington – backing vocals (tracks: 6, 11)
Mirage Mixeau – backing vocals (tracks: 11, 12)
Edward Theodore Riley – producer
Keith Spencer – producer
Dale Hogan – producer
Barbera Aimes – engineer/mixing
Anthony Saunders – assistant engineer/mixing
Dave Way – engineer
Jason Chervokas – engineer
Josh Chervokas – engineer
Al Singleton – assistant engineer
Ben Garrison – assistant engineer
Charlie Allen – assistant engineer
Dave Hecht – assistant engineer
Eric Lynch – assistant engineer
Scott Weatherspoon – assistant engineer
Tom Coyne – mastering
Sally Boon – photography

Charts

Album

Singles

References

External links 

1991 albums
Kool Moe Dee albums
Jive Records albums
Albums produced by Teddy Riley